Phyllonorycter nipponicella is a moth of the family Gracillariidae. It is known from Honshū island of Japan, and from Korea and the Russian Far East.

The wingspan is 7-8.5 mm.

The larvae feed on Quercus acutissima and Quercus variabilis. They mine the leaves of their host plant. The mine has the form of a ptychonomous blotch mine on the underside of the leaf.

References

nipponicella
Moths of Asia
Moths described in 1963